Francesco Diotallevi (1579 – May 1622) was a Roman Catholic prelate who served as Bishop of Sant'Angelo dei Lombardi e Bisaccia (1614–1622) and Apostolic Nuncio to Poland (1614–1621).

Biography
Francesco Diotallevi was born in Rimini, Italy in 1579.
On 21 July 1614, he was appointed during the papacy of Pope Paul V as Bishop of Sant'Angelo dei Lombardi e Bisaccia.
On 10 August 1614, he was ordained deacon and on 15 August 1614 as a priest. 
On 25 August 1614, he was appointed during the papacy of Pope Paul V as Apostolic Nuncio to Poland.
On 31 August 1614, he was consecrated bishop by Giovanni Garzia Mellini, Cardinal-Priest of Santi Quattro Coronati, with Michael Rezzi, Bishop of Nusco, and Lorenzo Landi, Bishop of Fossombrone, serving as co-consecrators. 
In 1621, he resigned as Apostolic Nuncio to Poland. 
He served as Bishop of Sant'Angelo dei Lombardi e Bisaccia until his death in May 1622.

References

External links and additional sources
 (for Chronology of Bishops) 
 (for Chronology of Bishops) 

17th-century Italian Roman Catholic bishops
Bishops appointed by Pope Paul V
1579 births
1622 deaths
Archbishops of Sant'Angelo dei Lombardi-Conza-Nusco-Bisaccia
Apostolic Nuncios to Poland